A drift fence is any long, continuous fence used to control the movement of animals in a particular open range, or to collect animals for research.

Drift fences were used in the Texas Panhandle from 1882 to 1887 to control "cattle drift"—the winter migration of livestock to warmer territory. Long sections of barbed wire fence were built by ranchers to keep the cattle from moving to the southern part of the state. This fence was disastrous for the animals during the winter of 1886-87. Deep snow covered the grasslands, and the fence prevented the herds from migrating to greener pastures. As a result, the cattle froze to death along the fences. Some 75 percent perished during the winter.

Regulation
The drift fence in Texas was built to hold back cattle from Oklahoma, Colorado, and Kansas from crossing into the state during blizzards. It was strung along the northern boundary of each ranch. The fence extended for two hundred miles in Texas, with a gate every three miles. As a result of the 1887 blizzard, Texas in 1889 passed a law prohibiting fencing of public property, and the fence was removed in 1890.

See also
 Charles Goodnight
 Fence Cutting Wars

References

External links
 
 
 Supply and installation of high quality clear view fencing for commercial and home
 From open range to total enclosure Selected essays on barbed wire

Fences
Livestock
Animal migration